In functional analysis and related areas of mathematics, the strong dual space of a topological vector space (TVS)  is the continuous dual space  of  equipped with the strong (dual) topology or the topology of uniform convergence on bounded subsets of  where this topology is denoted by  or  The coarsest polar topology is called weak topology. 
The strong dual space plays such an important role in modern functional analysis, that the continuous dual space is usually assumed to have the strong dual topology unless indicated otherwise. 
To emphasize that the continuous dual space,  has the strong dual topology,  or  may be written.

Strong dual topology 

Throughout, all vector spaces will be assumed to be over the field  of either the real numbers  or complex numbers

Definition from a dual system 

Let  be a dual pair of vector spaces over the field  of real numbers  or complex numbers  
For any  and any  define 

Neither  nor  has a topology so say a subset  is said to be  if  for all  
So a subset  is called  if and only if 
 

The definition of the strong dual topology now proceeds as in the case of a TVS. 
Note that if  is a TVS whose continuous dual space separates point on  then  is part of a canonical dual system  
where 

where  runs over the family of all bounded sets in  
The space  with this topology is called  of the space  and is denoted by

Definition on a TVS 

Suppose that  is a topological vector space (TVS) over the field  
the set of all bounded subsets of  forms a fundamental system of bounded sets of  

as  ranges over ). 
This is a locally convex topology that is given by the set of seminorms on :

as  ranges over  

Bidual 

where  denotes  endowed with the strong dual topology  

where the vector space  is endowed with the strong dual topology

Properties 

Let  be a locally convex TVS. 

 If  is a barreled space then 's topology is identical to the strong dual topology  and to the Mackey topology on 
 If  is locally convex, then this topology is finer than all other -topologies on  when considering only 's whose sets are subsets of 
 If  is a bornological space (e.g. metrizable or LF-space) then  is complete.

Examples 

If  is a normed vector space, then its (continuous) dual space  with the strong topology coincides with the Banach dual space ; that is, with the space  with the topology induced by the operator norm.

See also

References

Bibliography 

  
  
  
  
 

Functional analysis

Topology of function spaces
Linear functionals